George Addison Grant (January 6, 1903 – March 25, 1986) was a Major League Baseball pitcher who played for seven seasons. He played for the St. Louis Browns from 1923 to 1925, the Cleveland Indians from 1927 to 1929, and the Pittsburgh Pirates in 1931.

External links

1903 births
1986 deaths
St. Louis Browns players
Cleveland Indians players
Pittsburgh Pirates players
Major League Baseball pitchers
Baseball players from Alabama
Auburn Tigers baseball players